Semyon Viktorovich Belits-Geiman (born 16 February 1945) is a former Soviet freestyle swimmer.  He set a world record in the 800 m freestyle, and won two Olympic medals.

Early life
Belits-Geiman is Jewish and was born in Moscow, where he attended the Transport Engineering Institute, studied journalism, and worked as a journalist for the magazines Sports Life in Russia and Soviet Sport.

Swimming career

Belits-Geiman began swimming when he was eight.  He was affiliated with the Moscow club Dynamo, and became a member of the Soviet swimming team in 1962. He competed at the 1964 Olympics in Tokyo, and finished in seventh place in the 4 × 200 m freestyle relay and eighth in the 400 meter freestyle.

At the 1965 Summer Universiade, he won the gold medal in the 400 m freestyle and three silver medals in the 1,500 m and relay races.  In 1965, his time in the 1,500 m was the second-fastest in the world (17:01.90).

In 1966, he won the gold medal against three of the best American freestyle swimmers in a US vs USSR competition in Moscow.  That year at the European championships, he won gold medals in the 1,500 m freestyle (16:58.5) and 4 × 200 m freestyle relay (8:00.2) and a silver medal in the 400 m freestyle (4:13.2; behind German Frank Wiegand, and ahead of Frenchman Alain Mosconi). In 1966, he was ranked number three in the world in the 1,500-meter freestyle.

On 8 March 1966, he set a world record in the 800 m freestyle, at 8:47.4, in Budapest. That was 4.1 seconds faster than the former record set by Australian Murray Rose in 1962.

At the 1967 Universiade in Tokyo, he won a silver medal in the 1,500 m freestyle, behind American Mike Burton.

He won a silver medal at the 1968 Summer Olympics in Mexico City in the 4×100 freestyle relay (3:34.2), swimming the lead leg, and a bronze medal in the 4 × 200 m freestyle relay (8:01.6), swimming the second leg.  In the 4 × 200 m relay, one of his teammates was Vladimir Bure.  He also swam two individual freestyle events, finishing seventh in the 200 m freestyle, and ninth in the 400 m race. He broke 67 Soviet national freestyle records. In 1974, he was named president of the Moscow Swim Federation and vice president of the Soviet Union Federation.

Post-swimming career
Later in his life he competed in cross-country skiing and speed skating, and became a Soviet Master of Sport and coach in both disciplines.

Beginning in the early 1980s, he developed training programs for figure skaters.  He created a program to increase coordination and flexibility which was used by Australian ice dancing champions Natalie Buck and Trent Nelson-Bond in the early 2000s.

Accolades
In 2017, he was inducted into the International Jewish Sports Hall of Fame.

Personal
He met his wife, Russian ice dancing coach and former competitive ice dancer Natalia Dubova, when he covered one of her competitions as a sportswriter.  In 1999, they moved to Stamford, Connecticut.

See also
List of select Jewish swimmers
World record progression 800 metres freestyle

References

External links
USSR Swimming profile
The Sports profile

 

Living people
1945 births
Soviet male freestyle swimmers
Russian male freestyle swimmers
Jewish swimmers
Soviet Jews
Russian Jews
Swimmers from Moscow
Swimmers at the 1968 Summer Olympics
Olympic bronze medalists in swimming
Olympic bronze medalists for the Soviet Union
Olympic silver medalists for the Soviet Union
Swimmers at the 1964 Summer Olympics
Moscow State University alumni
Soviet journalists
Male journalists
Soviet male cross-country skiers
Soviet male speed skaters
European Aquatics Championships medalists in swimming
Medalists at the 1968 Summer Olympics
Olympic silver medalists in swimming
Universiade medalists in swimming
Universiade gold medalists for the Soviet Union
Universiade silver medalists for the Soviet Union
Medalists at the 1965 Summer Universiade